Krunoslav Lovrek (born 11 September 1979), also known as Kruno Lovrek , is a Croatian footballer currently playing for Croatian third division side Tehničar Cvetkovec. He plays as a striker.

Club career

Sydney FC
On 5 July 2012, it was announced that Lovrek had signed a 1-year deal with Sydney FC for the 2012–13 A-League season and joined his new teammates for the first time in pre-season training on 23 July 2012. However, as a result of Sydney FC failing to qualify for the A-League finals, Lovrek, along with teammates Paul Reid, Nathan Sherlock, Trent McClenahan, Adam Griffiths and Jarrod Kyle were released by Sydney FC at the conclusion of the 2012–13 A-League season.

He later had a spell at Austrian amateur side USV Dechantskirchen.

Club statistics

References

External links
 
 

 Krunoslav Lovrek national team appearances at the Croatian Football Federation official website 
  
 
 

1979 births
Living people
Sportspeople from Varaždin
Association football forwards
Croatian footballers
Croatia youth international footballers
Croatia under-21 international footballers
NK Zagreb players
Cerezo Osaka players
HNK Hajduk Split players
Lierse S.K. players
NK Croatia Sesvete players
Eskişehirspor footballers
Jeonbuk Hyundai Motors players
Qingdao Hainiu F.C. (1990) players
Sydney FC players
NK Sesvete players
Croatian Football League players
J1 League players
Belgian Pro League players
Süper Lig players
K League 1 players
Chinese Super League players
A-League Men players
First Football League (Croatia) players
Croatian expatriate footballers
Expatriate footballers in Japan
Croatian expatriate sportspeople in Japan
Expatriate footballers in Belgium
Croatian expatriate sportspeople in Belgium
Expatriate footballers in Turkey
Croatian expatriate sportspeople in Turkey
Expatriate footballers in South Korea
Croatian expatriate sportspeople in South Korea
Expatriate footballers in China
Croatian expatriate sportspeople in China
Expatriate soccer players in Australia
Croatian expatriate sportspeople in Australia
Expatriate footballers in Austria
Croatian expatriate sportspeople in Austria